WTMA (1250 kHz), “News Talk 1250 WTMA”, is a commercial AM radio station licensed to Charleston, South Carolina.  It has a talk radio format and is owned by Cumulus Media.   WTMA's studios and offices are on Faber Place Drive in North Charleston.

By day, WTMA broadcasts with 5,000 non-directional watts; but at night, to protect other stations on 1250 AM, WTMA reduces power to 1,000 watts and switches to a directional antenna with a two-tower array.  The transmitter is off Eton Road in Charleston.  The station streams its programming through its website, WTMA.com as well as through iHeart Radio and free smartphone apps.

Programming
In weekday morning drive time, WTMA airs a local news and information show hosted by John Quincy and Sheree Bernardi.  The rest of the weekday schedule is made up of nationally syndicated conservative talk shows, mostly from Cumulus subsidiary Westwood One.  They include Chris Plante, Ben Shapiro, Michael Knowles, Mark Levin, Dan Bongino, Red Eye Radio and America in the Morning.  Brian Kilmeade from Fox News Radio is heard middays.

Weekends feature shows on money, health, real estate and gardening, along with repeats of weekday shows.  Each hour begins with world and national news from ABC News Radio.

History
WTMA signed on the air on June 16, 1939.  It was an NBC Red Network affiliate and is the Charleston area's second-oldest AM radio station.  Of those two, WTMA is the only one to maintain its current call letters.  (Charleston's oldest station is WSPO 1390 AM.  Originally WCSC, it went on the air in 1930.)

In 1945, WTMA added an FM sister station which today is 95.1 WSSX.  From its beginnings through the early 1960s, WTMA carried NBC's dramas, comedies, news, sports, soap operas, game shows and big band broadcasts during the "Golden Age of Radio."

From the early 1960s through 1981, WTMA broadcast a Top 40 format and was an ABC Contemporary Network affiliate.  But like many other AM Radio Top 40 stations, it switched to an adult contemporary format in the early 80s until 1986 when young people began tuning in FM stations for the latest hits.  Over time, WTMA tried a couple different formats including R&B-flavored oldies and classic country music.  Then on June 1, 1989, it switched to its current talk format, under the ownership of Citadel Broadcasting.  Citadel merged with Cumulus Media on September 16, 2011.

In May 1999, WTMA lost popular syndicated shows by Rush Limbaugh and Dr. Laura to new talk radio competitor WSCC. Still, the station jumped from 13th to 7th in the morning and from 16th to 12th with 25-54 listeners. Program director Jason Wilmot said WTMA was still the number one station for news.

References

External links
News-Talk 1250 AM WTMA official website

WTMA History Site
FCC History Cards for WTMA

News and talk radio stations in the United States
Radio stations established in 1939
TMA
Cumulus Media radio stations
1939 establishments in South Carolina